Viktor Ivanovich Patsayev (19 June 193329 June 1971) was a Soviet cosmonaut who flew on the  Soyuz 11 mission and was part of the third space crew to die during a space flight. On board the space station Salyut 1 he operated the Orion 1 Space Observatory (see Orion 1 and Orion 2 Space Observatories); he became the first man to operate a telescope outside the Earth's atmosphere.

After a normal re-entry, the capsule was opened and the crew was found dead. It was discovered that a valve had opened just prior to leaving orbit that had allowed the capsule's atmosphere to vent away into space, suffocating the crew. One of Patsayev's hands was found to be bruised, and he may have been trying to shut the valve manually at the time he lost consciousness.

Patsayev's ashes were interned in the Kremlin Wall on Red Square in Moscow. He was posthumously awarded the title of Hero of the Soviet Union, the Order of Lenin and the title of Pilot-Cosmonaut of the USSR. The lunar crater Patsaev and the minor planet 1791 Patsayev are named for him.

Further reading
An account of Patsayev's life and space career appears in the 2003 book Fallen Astronauts: Heroes Who Died Reaching for the Moon by Colin Burgess.

References

1933 births
1971 deaths
People from Aktobe
1971 in spaceflight
Deaths in space
Heroes of the Soviet Union
Recipients of the Order of Lenin
Burials at the Kremlin Wall Necropolis
Soviet cosmonauts
Deaths from hypoxia
Employees of RSC Energia
Salyut program cosmonauts